Antonio Emildinov Fonseca Correia (born November 1, 1993) is a Cape Verdean footballer who plays as a forward.

Career
Correia signed with United Soccer League club Rochester Rhinos from Sporting Praia on February 9, 2017.  He played in 5 regular season matches and 2 US Open Cup matches, scoring one goal.

References

External links

1993 births
Living people
Footballers from Santiago, Cape Verde
Cape Verdean footballers
Sporting Clube da Praia players
Santiago South Premier Division players
Expatriate soccer players in the United States
Cape Verdean expatriate footballers
Rochester New York FC players
Association football forwards
USL Championship players